The Teachout Building is an historic building located in the East Village of Des Moines, Iowa, United States. It was individually listed on the National Register of Historic Places in 1999. In 2019 the building was included as a contributing property in the East Des Moines Commercial Historic District.

History
Horace E. Teachout, for whom the building was named, was a developer who helped plan the East Village. He started planning for what would be the tallest building on the east side of Des Moines in 1911, and it would be completed a year later. The prominent Des Moines architectural firm of Proudfoot, Bird and Rawson designed the building in the Early Commercial style.  It was one of the few high-rise buildings designed by the firm. A renovation of the building was begun in the 1970s, but was not completed because of the completion of the MacVicar freeway, Interstate 235, allowed people to bypass the area for other parts of the city and suburbs and made this section of Des Moines less desirable. It sat empty until it was eventually renovated in the 1990s. It currently houses retail businesses, offices and a private residence on the sixth floor.

References

Commercial buildings completed in 1912
Chicago school architecture in Iowa
Buildings and structures in Des Moines, Iowa
National Register of Historic Places in Des Moines, Iowa
Commercial buildings on the National Register of Historic Places in Iowa
Individually listed contributing properties to historic districts on the National Register in Iowa